Rybnoye is a rural locality (a selo) in Krinichenskoye Rural Settlement, Ostrogozhsky District, Voronezh Oblast, Russia. The population was 427 as of 2010. There are 11 streets.

Geography 
Rybnoye is located 8 km northeast of Ostrogozhsk (the district's administrative centre) by road. Sredne-Voskresenskoye is the nearest rural locality.

History 
Rybnoye was founded in 1765 by German settlers from Württemberg and was known as Riebensdorf.

References 

Rural localities in Ostrogozhsky District